Addie Walsh (born 1953) is an American television soap opera writer.  She last wrote for All My Children.  She now writes independently.   Her one-woman show, That's All I Got, received an award at the United Solo Festival in 2014, in New York City.

Life
In 2020, she was one of the recruits for a fiction app named "Radish" which had $63,000,000 of funding and it was opening an office in LA. The soap writers recruited included Walsh, Janet Iacobuzio, Lisa Connor, Leah Laiman, and Jean Passanante.

Positions held
All My Children
Associate head writer: April 2000 – April 2002; July 2003 – January 14, 2008 (hired by Megan McTavish); March 19, 2008 – September 23, 2011

As the World Turns
Co-head writer: 1997
Associate head writer: 1995–1999

Days of Our Lives
Associate head writer: November 7, 1999 – 2000 (hired Sally Sussman Morina), 2002–2003

Guiding Light (hired by Pamela K. Long)
Associate head writer: 1983–1986, 1993

Loving
Head writer: 1991–1992 (resigned in 1992 after dispute with Executive Producer Haidee Granger)
Co-head writer: 1994 (rehired by Josie Emmerich in 1994 and paired with Laurie McCarthy)

Riviera
Creator: 1990-1991

One Life to Live
Associate head writer: 1987–1991

Search for Tomorrow
Co-head writer: 1986

Texas
Breakdown Writer: 1982

Awards and nominations
Daytime Emmy Awards

WINS
(1986; Best Writing; Guiding Light)

NOMINATIONS 
(1985; Best Writing; Guiding Light)
(1990; Best Writing; One Life to Live)
(1996 & 2000; Best Writing; As the World Turns)
(2001, 2002, 2003, 2004, 2009, 2010 & 2012; Best Writing; All My Children)

Writers Guild of America Award

WINS
(1994 season; Loving)
(2001, 2002 & 2004 seasons; All My Children)

NOMINATIONS 
(1985 & 1986 seasons; Guiding Light)
(1998 & 1999 seasons; As the World Turns)
(2007, 2008, 2010 & 2012 seasons; All My Children)

Head writing tenure

References

External links
ABC: All My Children

1953 births
Living people
American soap opera writers
Daytime Emmy Award winners
American women television writers
Writers Guild of America Award winners
Place of birth missing (living people)
Women soap opera writers
21st-century American women